Extra is a brand of sugarfree chewing gum produced by the Wrigley Company in North America, Europe, Australia and some parts of Africa and Asia.

Brand history 
Extra was launched in 1984 as the Wrigley Company's first ever sugarfree product, and became one of the most popular brands of chewing gum in the United States within a few years. It was also the first sugarfree gum not to use saccharin, instead using the NutraSweet brand, a sweetener developed by G.D. Searle & Co. that had less bitterness and was believed to be safer in humans and laboratory animals; it was later reformulated with aspartame in 1997.

The brand identity of Extra gum varies considerably in different markets, often having completely different flavours, logos and slogans for each country. Extra is currently the sponsor of the Mexico national football team.

In 2011, Extra Oral Healthcare Program partnered with the Chinese Ministry of Health to launch a three-year community oral care education pilot program, which establishes community dental clinics, trains local dentists and establishes oral care records for 7,000 families across 14 communities. The results of the program will inform the Ministry of Health's future oral care policy. In the second project year, the team decided to build an application for oral health teaching among families, especially for some undeveloped cities.

In the UK, a similar chewing gum brand owned by Wrigley's; Orbit was renamed Extra in 2015, with the same 14-piece package.

A TV ad for Extra chewing gum, seen in September 2017, featured a young woman stood in a football kit on a football pitch whilst chewing, appearing to be preparing to take a penalty kick. A complaint to the ASA was upheld with the ad being described as 'dangerous'.

Flavors

References

External links 
 
 Wrigley's Extra Gum home page

Wrigley Company brands
Products introduced in 1984
Chewing gum
Brand name confectionery
American confectionery